Catherine of Austria (14 January 1507 – 12 February 1578) was Queen of Portugal as wife of King John III, and regent during the minority of her grandson, King Sebastian, from 1557 until 1562.

Early life

An Infanta of Castile and Archduchess of Austria, Catherine was the posthumous daughter of King Philip I by Queen Joanna of Castile. Catherine was born in Torquemada and named in honor of her maternal aunt, Catherine of Aragon. She remained with her mentally unstable mother.

All of her five older siblings, except Ferdinand, were born in the Low Countries and had been put into the care of their aunt Margaret of Austria, but Joanna kept hold of young Catherine. Catherine actually stayed with her mother during imprisonment at Tordesillas during her grandfather Ferdinand of Aragon's time as regent and her elder brother Carlos as co-king. When the time came for her to marry, Catherine was released from the custody that her mother was to endure until her death.

Queen
On 10 February 1525, at the age of 18, Catherine married her first cousin, King John III of Portugal, 
she was married off to him by her mother Joanna I of Castile. They had nine children, but only two survived early childhood.

Catherine was very concerned about the education of her family, accumulating a substantial library and establishing a kind of salon in the court. She brought a number of women scholars into her household, including the humanists Joana Vaz and Públia Hortênsia de Castro, and the poet Luisa Sigea de Velasco. Vaz was responsible for tutoring Catherine's daughter, Princess Maria, as well as Catherine's niece, also called Maria, and a scholar in her own right.

After the death of her husband in 1557, she was challenged by her daughter-in-law and niece Joanna of Austria, over the role of regent for her grandchild, the infant King Sebastian. Mediation by Charles V resolved the issue in favour of his sister Catherine over his daughter Joan, who was needed in Spain in the absence of Philip II.

She then served as the regent of Portugal from 1557 until 1562. In 1562, she turned over the regency to Henry of Portugal.

Collector
Catherine had one of the earliest and finest Chinese porcelain collections in Europe due to her position as both the youngest sister of Emperor Charles V and the Queen of Portugal. "She acquired quantities of porcelain and exotica from Asia, which arrived regularly in Lisbon for the decoration of the Lisbon royal palace as well as for her personal use, and which served as emblems of her power. Her collection became the first kunstkammer on the Iberian Peninsula." She was following a tradition established earlier by the Portuguese King Manuel I of Portugal who had purchased porcelain for his wife, Maria of Castile (1482-1517), who was Catherine's aunt. Between 1511 and 1514, the 'Treasurer of the Spices' in Lisbon "registered a total of 692 pieces of porcelain and other exotic goods" bought on his behalf for Maria of Castile, who was then King Manuel's second wife. Amongst other 'exotica' in Catherine's collection were fossilised sharks' teeth, a snake's head encased in gold, heart-shaped jasper stones to stop bleeding, a coral branch used as a protector against evil spirits, bezoar stones, a unicorn's horn (a narwhal tusk) and piles of loose gems and stones such as rubies, emeralds, and diamonds.

Issue

Catherine has no descendants today, as both her grandchildren died childless. Her line of descent became extinct within six months of her death, as the only descendant of hers that survived her, King Sebastian of Portugal, died in August 1578.

In popular culture
Catherine of Austria figures in José Saramago's 2008 novel The Elephant's Journey. She also figures in Laurent Binet’s 2019 novel Civilizations.

She was also featured in Kei Ohkubo's manga Arte, under the alias Irene at first; later, she revealed herself as Catalina, daughter to Juana of Castile. The timing was unspecified, but this fictitious arrival of Catalina at Florence could be some time between her release from custody and before her marriage; during her inner monologue, her brother, who had ordered a cardinal that was accommodating Catalina's trip to watch over her movements, was shown wearing a crown.

Ancestry

Sources

1507 births
1578 deaths
16th-century women rulers
16th-century Spanish people
16th-century Portuguese people
16th-century House of Habsburg
Aragonese infantas
Austrian princesses
Castilian infantas
House of Aviz
Daughters of kings
Portuguese salon-holders
Portuguese people of British descent
Portuguese queens consort
Regents of Portugal
Spanish infantas
Spanish people of Austrian descent